Claude Montana (29 June 1947 in Paris) is a French fashion designer. His company, The House of Montana, founded in 1979, went bankrupt in 1997.

Early life and Design career 
Born in Paris in 1947 to a Catalan father and a German mother, Montana began his career by designing papier-mâché jewelry covered with rhinestones. Later, he discovered leather and the complex techniques associated with it, eventually becoming a leading force in leather. His first fashion show took place in 1976. He attracted attention the following year for his leather coats and in 1978 was among the most extreme in presenting the broad shoulders that were introduced for the fall of that year, joining Thierry Mugler in showing massively-shouldered retro sci-fi looks at the end of the seventies, both designers also using the most influential footwear designer of the time, Maud Frizon, for the shoes in their collections. Like Mugler and like Azzedine Alaïa and a few others of this period, Montana's designs displayed a longing for styles of the 1940s and '50s. He was an avid colorist and favored blue, red, metallic, and neutral tones, in luxurious materials such as cashmere, leather and silk. He started his own company, The House of Montana, in 1979, and quickly became a darling of 1980s high fashion along with Thierry Mugler, who also favored aggressive shapes and strong colours. Through 1986, he would continue to be associated with exaggerated shoulder pads, even declaring in 1985, "Shoulders forever," but in 1987 he began to soften his style, with some moves in that direction as early as 1984, and in 1988 he presented much-reduced shoulders and even shoulderless tops in an architectural but softened spring collection that focused on standaway waists, collars, and jacket fronts, the lines reminding fashion historian Bill Cunningham of the sculpture of Jean Arp. By fall of 1988, he had moved in most of his garments to a completely natural shoulder while still maintaining a commanding line, now given to a geometric trapeze shaping that extended even to wide-hemmed pants, a silhouette he would focus on through the first half of 1989. At the end of the eighties, he, along with Romeo Gigli, contributed to a trend toward dramatic collar treatments on the now-natural shoulders of his garments. In the earliest 1990s, Montana returned somewhat to futuristic looks, this time joining a trend toward sixties Space Age revival, with sharply tailored suits featuring vivid colors, prominent zippers, stretch fabrics, and angular but narrow shoulders.

Creations 
In 1981, Montana designed his first collection for men, called Montana Hommes, in which he focused on the color and material of each garment rather than trivial details. From 1990 to 1992 he designed haute couture collections for the House of Lanvin, for which he received two consecutive Golden Thimble awards. Despite critical acclaim, Montana's bold designs were financially disastrous for the house, created at a total estimated loss of $50 million, and he was ultimately replaced by Dominique Morlotti. In 1999, he designed an affordable line of clothing for women, Montana BLU. It was inspired by his favorite themes but modified to fit the style of sportswear and citywear.

Fashion Shows 
Montana's fashion shows excelled in styling as well as in presentation. Because of their vibrations, modelling for Montana became prestigious and invitations to his shows the hottest tickets in town. With fashion's return to harder lines in 2007 Montana has become an inspiration for many designers. Alexander McQueen praised and honored Montana many times in his collections. Both designers shared a love for construction and high quality.

Personal life 
On July 21, 1993, Montana married model Wallis Franken. It was a marriage of convenience and friendship, as Montana was openly homosexual. He wanted to appear more marketable to polysexual buyers, and she was his best choice for this purpose. They were the same age, had been friends for 18 years, and she had served as his muse for many of his fashion innovations. Wallis already had two daughters and a granddaughter by a previous marriage. In June 1996, Wallis died after falling three stories from their Paris apartment. The death was ruled a suicide.

Author 
In October 2010 it was announced that Claude Montana and Marielle Cro were working on a coffee-table book documenting Montana's career. The book, "Claude Montana: Fashion Radical," includes photos and interviews with insiders who witnessed Montana's career firsthand. It came out in April 2011 in the U.S and U.K.

Awards
 Best Women's Collection, Summer 1985, Paris.
 Best European Designer, Fall/Winter 1987/88, Munchener Modewoche, Germany.
 Balenciaga Prize for Best Designer, 1989.
 Golden Thimble Award, 1991, 1992.

References

 Montana Website
 Claude Montana at infomat.com.
 Claude Montana at Fédération Française de la Couture.

External links

French fashion designers
LGBT fashion designers
1949 births
Living people
21st-century LGBT people
French people of German descent